Ill-Young Kim (born 13 May 1973) is a German actor, comedian, and musician of Korean descent.

Selected filmography

References

External links 

1973 births
Living people
German male film actors

German male television actors
German comedians
German musicians
German people of Korean descent
Actors from Cologne